Phyllonorycter leucocorona is a moth of the family Gracillariidae. It is known from the islands of Hokkaidō, Honshū and Kyūshū in Japan.

The larvae feed on Quercus dentata and Quercus serrata. They mine the leaves of their host plant. The mine has the form of a very small, tentiform mine between two veins on the underside of the leaf.

References

leucocorona
Moths of Japan
Moths described in 1957